Yang Qianhe (楊千鶴) (1921–2011) was a Taiwanese journalist, and considered Taiwan's first woman journalist.

Biography 
Yang Qianhe was born in Taipei in 1921. She was educated in Japanese as Taiwan was under Japanese control at this time, and graduated from Taipei Women's College. She initially worked as a journalist for a Taiwan-based Japanese newspaper Taiwan Daily News.

She also wrote novels and short stories. In 1942 she published a short story, The Seasons When Flowers Bloom, which reflects on women's choices in upper-middle class society and social expectations on women to marry. In 1995 she published her memoir, Prism of Life.

References 

1921 births
2011 deaths
Taiwanese expatriates in Japan
Taiwanese journalists
Taiwanese women journalists
20th-century journalists
Taiwanese memoirists
Women memoirists
20th-century memoirists